The 1996 Stanley Cup playoffs, the playoff tournament of the National Hockey League (NHL), began on April 16, 1996. The 16 teams that qualified (8 from each conference) played best-of-seven series for conference quarterfinals, semifinals and championships, and then the conference champions played a best-of-seven series for the Stanley Cup. These playoffs are noted as being the first playoffs in which all Canadian teams were eliminated during the first round. The New Jersey Devils, who had won the Stanley Cup the year before, failed to qualify for these playoffs. This was the first time that both Florida teams—the Florida Panthers and Tampa Bay Lightning—made it to the playoffs.

The playoffs ended on June 10 with the Colorado Avalanche sweeping the Florida Panthers in both teams' first-ever Finals appearance. It was Colorado's first-ever Stanley Cup championship in their inaugural season after relocating from Quebec City prior to the start of the regular season; in the previous years, they were known as the Quebec Nordiques. Joe Sakic was named playoff MVP and awarded the Conn Smythe Trophy.

For the second time in three years and the last time until 2013, all of the Original Six teams reached the playoffs. This was also the last time all three California-based teams missed the playoffs in the same year until 2020.

Playoff seeds

The following teams qualified for the playoffs:

Eastern Conference
 Philadelphia Flyers, Atlantic Division champions, Eastern Conference regular season champions – 103 points
 Pittsburgh Penguins, Northeast Division champions – 102 points
 New York Rangers – 96 points
 Florida Panthers – 92 points
 Boston Bruins – 91 points
 Montreal Canadiens – 90 points
 Washington Capitals – 89 points
 Tampa Bay Lightning – 88 points

Western Conference
 Detroit Red Wings, Central Division champions, Western Conference regular season champions, Presidents' Trophy winners – 131 points
 Colorado Avalanche, Pacific Division champions – 104 points
 Chicago Blackhawks – 94 points
 Toronto Maple Leafs – 80 points (34 wins)
 St. Louis Blues – 80 points (32 wins)
 Calgary Flames – 79 points (34 wins)
 Vancouver Canucks – 79 points (32 wins)
 Winnipeg Jets – 78 points

Playoff bracket

Conference Quarterfinals

Eastern Conference Quarterfinals

(1) Philadelphia Flyers vs. (8) Tampa Bay Lightning

This was the first playoff meeting between these two teams. This was the first time that the Tampa Bay area was represented in the Stanley Cup playoffs. Game six was the final game they ever played at the Thunderdome.

(2) Pittsburgh Penguins vs. (7) Washington Capitals

This was the third consecutive and fifth overall playoff meeting between these two teams; with Pittsburgh winning three of the four previous series. Pittsburgh won last year's playoff meeting in seven games. Game four of this series is the sixth longest game in NHL history. Game six was the last playoff game at USAir Arena.

(3) New York Rangers vs. (6) Montreal Canadiens
This was the fourteenth playoff meeting between these two teams; with Montreal winning seven of the thirteen previous series. They last met in the 1986 Prince of Wales Conference Final, which Montreal won in five games.

(4) Florida Panthers vs. (5) Boston Bruins

This was the first and to date only playoff meeting between these two teams. This was the first time that Miami was represented in the Stanley Cup playoffs.

Western Conference Quarterfinals

(1) Detroit Red Wings vs. (8) Winnipeg Jets

This was the first playoff meeting between these two teams. This was the final playoff series for the original Winnipeg Jets as they relocated to Phoenix, Arizona after the season.  Game six was the final NHL game played at the Winnipeg Arena.

(2) Colorado Avalanche vs. (7) Vancouver Canucks

This was the first playoff meeting between these two teams. This series marked the first appearance of a team representing Colorado in the Stanley Cup playoffs in 18 years. The most recent team to represent Colorado prior to this was the Colorado Rockies who lost in the preliminary round in 1978.

(3) Chicago Blackhawks vs. (6) Calgary Flames
This was the third playoff meeting between these two teams; with Calgary winning both previous series. They last met in the 1989 Clarence Campbell Conference Final, which Calgary won in five games.

(4) Toronto Maple Leafs vs. (5) St. Louis Blues

This was the fifth playoff meeting between these two teams: with the teams splitting the four previous playoff series. They last met in the 1993 Norris Division Finals, which Toronto won in seven games. Game five was the last playoff game at Maple Leaf Gardens.

Conference Semifinals

Eastern Conference Semifinals

(1) Philadelphia Flyers vs. (4) Florida Panthers

This was the first playoff meeting between these two teams. Game five was the last game played at the CoreStates Spectrum.

(2) Pittsburgh Penguins vs. (3) New York Rangers
This was the third playoff meeting between these two teams; with Pittsburgh winning both previous series. They last met in the 1992 Patrick Division Finals, which Pittsburgh won in six games.

Western Conference Semifinals

(1) Detroit Red Wings vs. (5) St. Louis Blues
This was the fourth playoff meeting between these two teams; with St. Louis winning two of the three previous series. They last met in the 1991 Norris Division Semifinals, which St. Louis won in seven games.

(2) Colorado Avalanche vs. (3) Chicago Blackhawks
This was the first playoff meeting between these two teams.

Conference Finals

Eastern Conference Final

(2) Pittsburgh Penguins vs. (4) Florida Panthers
This was the first playoff meeting between these two teams. This was Pittsburgh's third Conference Final appearance. They last made the Conference Final in 1992, where they defeated the Boston Bruins in four games. This was Florida's first Conference Final appearance in their third season since entering the league as an expansion team in 1993.

Despite being outshot 33–25 in game one, the Panthers came out on top with an impressive 5–1 win. Florida goaltender John Vanbiesbrouck made 32 saves and Florida forward Tom Fitzgerald scored twice. The Penguins wanting to avoid going down two games to none against the Panthers came out with a better effort in game two and won the game 3–2 and evened the series at one game each. In game three, the Panthers fired an incredible 61 shots on Penguins goaltender Tom Barrasso and it paid off as the Panthers won 5–2 to take a 2–1 series lead, with Florida forward Stu Barnes scoring twice. Going into the third period of game four, the Penguins trailed 1–0. Pittsburgh tied the score on Brad Lauer's goal with 11:03 remaining in regulation, then Bryan Smolinski scored the go ahead goal with 3:31 to go to give the Penguins a 2–1 lead. Pittsburgh hung on to win the game 2–1 and tie the series at two games apiece. In game five, the Penguins shut-out the Panthers 3–0, with Tom Barrasso stopping all 28 Florida shots he faced.

Leading the series three games to two, Pittsburgh looked to advance to the Stanley Cup Finals in game six. The Penguins led 2–1 in the second period, but the Panthers scored three of the next four goals and edged the Penguins 4–3 to tie the series at 3–3. In game seven, Florida took a 1–0 lead on Mike Hough's goal at 13:13 of the first period. After a scoreless second period, Pittsburgh tied the game on Petr Nedved's power-play goal at 1:23 of the third period. The Panthers regained the lead on Tom Fitzgerald's bizarre 58-foot slapshot at 6:18 and got an insurance goal from Johan Garpenlov at 17:23. Florida hung on to win the game 3–1 and the series four games to three, John Vanbiesbrouck making 39 saves in the victory. This was the last playoff series victory for the Panthers until 2022 when they beat against the Washington Capitals in six games.

Western Conference Final

(1) Detroit Red Wings vs. (2) Colorado Avalanche
This was the first playoff meeting between these two teams. This was Detroit's second consecutive and fourth overall Conference Final appearance. They defeated the Chicago Blackhawks in the previous year in five games. This was Colorado's third Conference Final appearance in franchise history and first since relocating to Colorado. They last went to the Conference Final in 1985, which they lost to the Philadelphia Flyers in six games when the team was known as the Quebec Nordiques.

Game 1 was a hard-fought battle. The score was tied at two in the first overtime period when Mike Keane scored at 17:31 to give Colorado a 3–2 win. The Avalanche won Game 2, 3–0, with Colorado goaltender Patrick Roy stopping all 35 shots faced. Down two games to none, the Red Wings played solidly in Game 3. Detroit defencemen Nicklas Lidstrom and Vladimir Konstantinov combined to score three goals (including a shorthanded goal by Konstantinov) and Detroit won 6–4. In game four the Red Wings outshot the Avalanche 31–17 but lost the game 4–2 thanks to 29 saves made by Patrick Roy.

Detroit played with desperation and determination in game five. Inspired by Vladimir Konstantinov's big body check on Avalanche forward Claude Lemieux, the Red Wings went on to win 5–2. The Red Wings victory forced a Game 6 back in Colorado. Game 6 became famous in the history of the Red Wings-Avalanche rivalry. At 14:07 of the first period, Detroit forward Kris Draper was down along the half-boards at centre ice when Colorado forward Claude Lemieux checked Draper's head from behind into the edge of the bench. The hit sent Draper to the hospital with a broken jaw and a shattered cheek and orbital bone, which required surgery and stitches. Draper did not return to play until the middle of the 1996–97 season. While Lemieux was assessed a five-minute major penalty and a game misconduct match penalty for the hit, the Avalanche went on to win the game 4–1 and completed the upset. The controversial hit on Draper by Lemieux was a catalyst (along with a rough hit by Kozlov on Foote in Game 3) for the Detroit–Colorado rivalry that endured for a decade.

Stanley Cup Finals

Since the formation of the NHL in 1917 this was the only time to date that both teams competing in the Stanley Cup Finals made their first appearance.

This was the first and to date only playoff series between these two teams. Colorado made their first Finals appearance in their first season in Denver, this was the franchise's seventeenth season in the league, while Florida made their first Finals appearance in just their third season of existence. Colorado became the third NHL team to win the Stanley Cup following a relocation, and the first to do so in their inaugural season after relocation.

Playoff statistics

Skaters
These are the top ten skaters based on points.

Goaltenders
This is a combined table of the top five goaltenders based on goals against average and the top five goaltenders based on save percentage, with at least 420 minutes played. The table is sorted by GAA, and the criteria for inclusion are bolded.

See also
 1995–96 NHL season
 Red Wings-Avalanche brawl 1997

References

Play
Stanley Cup playoffs